Constitutional Convention elections were held in Kuwait on 30 December 1961, having originally been planned for 1 November.
It was the country's first-ever election, and elected a body responsible for drawing up a constitution. Around 40,000 men were eligible to vote, with turnout of registered voters at 90.0%. A total of 74 candidates stood for the 20 elected seats.

Results

References

Kuwait
Constitutional Convention election
Elections in Kuwait
Non-partisan elections
Election and referendum articles with incomplete results
December 1961 events in Asia